Rhododendron araiophyllum (窄叶杜鹃) is a flowering plant in the Ericaceae family. It is native to northeast Myanmar and northeastern and western Yunnan, China, where it grows at altitudes of 1900–3400 meters. It is a shrub that grows to 1–4 m in height, with leathery leaves that are elliptic-lanceolate or narrowly lanceolate, 5–11 by 1.3–3 cm in size. Flowers are predominantly white.

References

Sources
 "Rhododendron araiophyllum", I. B. Balfour & W. W. Smith, Trans. Bot. Soc. Edinburgh. 27: 184. 1917.
 The Plant List
 Flora of China
 Hirsutum.com

araiophyllum
Taxa named by William Wright Smith
Taxa named by Isaac Bayley Balfour